Peter Haymond is an American diplomat who has served as the United States Ambassador to Laos since 2020.

Early life and education 

Haymond earned a Bachelor of Arts from Brigham Young University and an Master of Arts in Law and Diplomacy and Doctor of Philosophy from the Fletcher School of Law and Diplomacy at Tufts University.

Career 

Haymond is a career member of the Senior Foreign Service, class of Minister-Counselor, joining the Foreign Service in 1991. Previous posts include being Director of the State Department's Office of Chinese and Mongolian Affairs, Consul General at the United States Consulate in Chengdu, China, and Deputy Chief of Mission at the United States Embassy in Vientiane, Laos.  He also served as Division Chief in the Office of Energy and Commodities in the Bureau of Economic and Energy Affairs at the Department of State, and as Arabian Peninsula Officer in the Office of the Counterterrorism Coordinator. He recently served as Chargé d’Affaires at the United States Embassy in Bangkok, Thailand.

On September 3, 2019, President nominated Haymond to be the next United States Ambassador to Laos. His nomination was sent to the United States Senate on September 9, 2019. He appeared before the Foreign Relations Committee on October 31, 2019. On December 19, 2019, his nomination was confirmed in the Senate by voice vote. He was sworn in on January 15, 2020, and presented his credentials to Laotian President Bounnhang Vorachit in Vientiane on February 7, 2020.

Personal life 

Haymond is married to his wife of over 30 years, Dusadee. He speaks Lao, Thai, Mandarin, and French.

See also
List of ambassadors of the United States
List of ambassadors appointed by Donald Trump

References

Living people
Date of birth missing (living people)
Place of birth missing (living people)
20th-century American diplomats
21st-century American diplomats
Ambassadors of the United States to Laos
Brigham Young University alumni
The Fletcher School at Tufts University alumni
United States Department of State officials
United States Foreign Service personnel
Year of birth missing (living people)